Loser Lover is a 1999 erotic thriller film directed by Jean-Marc Vallée.

Cast
 Laurel Holloman as Lily Delacroix
 Andy Davoli as Tim
 Rachel Robinson as Kilo
 Burt Young as Sydney Delacroix
 Lauren Hutton as Annie Delacroix

References

External links
 

1999 films
1990s erotic thriller films
Canadian erotic thriller films
English-language Canadian films
1990s English-language films
1990s Canadian films